WDR 2 Klassik was a German, public radio station owned and operated by the Westdeutscher Rundfunk (WDR).

References

Westdeutscher Rundfunk
Defunct radio stations in Germany
Radio stations established in 1997
Radio stations disestablished in 2009
1997 establishments in Germany
2009 disestablishments in Germany
Mass media in Cologne